Auxa pulchra is a species of beetle in the family Cerambycidae. It was described by Breuning in 1966.

References

Auxa
Beetles described in 1966